James Edward Fitzgerald (August 3, 1891 – April 18, 1966) was an American ice hockey player who competed in the 1920 Summer Olympics. He was a defenseman on the American ice hockey team, which won the silver medal. He was born in Northfield, Minnesota.

References

External links
 
profile

1891 births
1966 deaths
American men's ice hockey defensemen
Ice hockey players from Minnesota
Ice hockey players at the 1920 Summer Olympics
Medalists at the 1920 Summer Olympics
Olympic silver medalists for the United States in ice hockey
People from Northfield, Minnesota
St. Paul Athletic Club ice hockey players